William P. Clements Jr. University Hospital is a hospital in the Southwestern Medical District in Dallas, Texas, United States.  It is one of the main teaching hospitals of the University of Texas Southwestern Medical Center.

History
The hospital is named in honor of former Texas Gov. William P. Clements Jr., who in 2009 made a landmark $100 million contribution to the Southwestern Medical Foundation, the largest single gift in the foundation's history.

The hospital's three towers were built on a total $1.2 Billion budget between 2014 and 2020.

The Zale Lipshy Pavilion – William P. Clements Jr. University Hospital at 5151 Harry Hines Blvd. is part of William P. Clements Jr. University Hospital.

Rankings
In 2019 the hospital was ranked as the top hospital in the Dallas-Fort Worth area by U.S. News & World Report.

References

Hospitals in Dallas
Southwestern Medical District
Teaching hospitals in Texas
University of Texas System
Hospitals established in 2014